Gideon Githiga was an Anglican bishop in Kenya: he was the inaugural Bishop of Thika, and served until 2013.

References

21st-century Anglican bishops of the Anglican Church of Kenya
20th-century Anglican bishops of the Anglican Church of Kenya
Anglican bishops of Thika